Giacomo Giordano, O.S.B. (died 1661) was a Roman Catholic prelate who served as Bishop of Lacedonia (1651–1661).

Biography
Giacomo Giordano was ordained a priest in Order of Saint Benedict.
On 28 Oct 1651, he was appointed during the papacy of Pope Innocent X as Bishop of Lacedonia.
On 29 Oct 1651, he was consecrated bishop by Niccolò Albergati-Ludovisi, Archbishop of Bologna, with Girolamo Buonvisi, Titular Archbishop of Laodicea in Phrygia, and Ranuccio Scotti Douglas, Bishop of Borgo San Donnino, serving as co-consecrators. 
He served as Bishop of Lacedonia until his death on 9 Nov 1661.

References

External links and additional sources
 (for Chronology of Bishops) 
 (for Chronology of Bishops) 

17th-century Italian Roman Catholic bishops
Bishops appointed by Pope Innocent X
1661 deaths
Benedictine bishops